Anna Sztankovics (born January 10, 1996) is a Hungarian swimmer, who specializes in the breaststroke events. She is the current holder of the Hungarian record in the 50m breaststroke event both in long course and in short course. 

Sztankovics was born in Budapest. She won two gold medals in the 100 m breaststroke at the 2011 European Junior Swimming Championships in Belgrade, Serbia, and at the 2012 European Junior Swimming Championships in Antwerp, Belgium. Sztankovics is a member of Jövő Swimming Club in Budapest, and is coached and trained by Balazs Virth.

Sztankovics qualified for three swimming events at the 2012 Summer Olympics in London, by meeting FINA B-standard entry times of 1:09.31 (100 m breaststroke) and 2:30.26 (200 m breaststroke) from the European Championships. In the 100 m breaststroke, Sztankovics challenged seven other swimmers on the second heat, including two-time Olympian Danielle Beaubrun of St. Lucia. She cruised to second place and thirty-first overall by two hundredths of a second (0.02) behind Slovenia's Tjasa Vozel in 1:09.65. In the 200 m breaststroke, Sztankovics picked up another second spot in heat one behind three-time Olympian Alia Atkinson of Jamaica by less than 0.10 of a second, in her lifetime best of 2:29.67. Sztankovics failed to advance into the semifinals, as she placed twenty-ninth overall in the preliminaries.

Sztankovics also teamed up with Zsuzsanna Jakabos, Evelyn Verrasztó, and Eszter Dara in the 4 × 100 m medley relay. Swimming the breaststroke leg, Sztankovics recorded a split of 1:17.43.

In 2014, she represented Hungary at the 2014 Summer Youth Olympics held in Nanjing, China and she won the bronze medal in the 50 m breaststroke and 200 m breaststroke events.

References

External links
NBC Olympics Profile

1996 births
Living people
Hungarian female swimmers
Swimmers at the 2012 Summer Olympics
Swimmers at the 2016 Summer Olympics
Olympic swimmers of Hungary
Hungarian female breaststroke swimmers
Swimmers from Budapest
Swimmers at the 2014 Summer Youth Olympics
20th-century Hungarian women
21st-century Hungarian women